Gim Yu-sin (sometimes romanized Kim Yu-shin, Gim Yu-sin, or Gim Yu-shin) (595 – 18 August 673)  was a Korean military general and politician in 7th-century Silla. He led the unification of the Korean Peninsula by Silla under the reign of King Muyeol and King Munmu. He is said to have been the great-grandchild of King Guhae of Geumgwan Gaya, the last ruler of the Geumgwan Gaya state. This would have given him a very high position in the Silla bone rank system, which governed the political and military status that a person could attain.

Much of what is known about Gim's life comes from the detailed account in the Samguk Sagi, Yeoljeon 1-3, and the much briefer record in the Samguk Yusa, vol. 1.

Early years 
Gim Yu-shin was the son of General Gim Seohyeon (the second son of General Gim Mu-ryeok) and Lady Manmyeong, who was a daughter of Gim Sukheuljong (King Jinheung of Silla's younger brother). He was born in Manno county(this is present-day Jincheon County) in 595, became a Hwarang warrior at just 15 and was an accomplished swordsman and a Gukseon (Hwarang leader) by the time he was 18 years old. By the age of 34 (in 629) he had been given total command of the Silla armed forces. Three years later, Gim Yu-sin's cousin, Princess Deokman, became Queen Seondeok of Silla and kept Gim Yu-sin as commander in chief of the royal army. During the reign of Queen Seondeok of Silla (632–647), Gim Yu-sin owned ten thousand private soldiers, won many battles against Baekje and became one of the most powerful men in Silla.

Military accomplishments 

Gim Yu-sin's first military engagement in command is believed to have occurred around 629 AD, and through it he quickly proved his capabilities as a warrior. Silla was in a constant struggle with its neighbor to the west, Baekje, over territory. There had been gains and losses on both sides, and the struggle lasted for many years. It was during this period that Yu-sin rose through the ranks of the military, rising to the position of general and becoming a skilled field commander.

Baekje and Silla had formed an alliance to counter Goguryeo's power and its intentions to push southwards, and together they launched a successful attack on it, Silla taking the northern territory and Baekje the one south of the Han river. But Silla broke the alliance and attacked Baekje in order to claim both territories for itself. After this betrayal, Baekje allied with Goguryeo. When Goguryeo and Baekje attacked Silla in 655, Silla joined forces with Tang dynasty China to battle the invaders. Although it is not clear when Gim Yu-shin first became a general, he was certainly commanding the Silla forces by this time. Eventually, with the help of 50,000 Silla army and some 130,000 Tang forces, Yushin attacked the Baekje capital, Sabi, in 660, in one of the most famous battles of that century, the Battle of Hwangsanbeol.

The Baekje defenders were commanded by none other than General Gyebaek, although the Baekje forces consisted of about 5,000 men and were no match for Yu-Shin's warriors, which numbered about ten times as many. Baekje, which had already been experiencing internal political problems, crumbled. Gim Yu-shin's Silla forces and their Tang allies now moved on Goguryeo from two directions, and in 661 they attacked the seemingly impregnable Goguryeo kingdom, but were repelled. The attack had weakened Goguryeo, though. In 667 another offensive was launched which, in 668, finally destroyed Goguryeo.

Silla still had to subdue various pockets of resistance, but their efforts were then focused on ensuring that their Tang allies did not overstay their welcome on the peninsula. After some difficult conflicts, Silla eventually forced out the Tang troops and united the peninsula under their rule.

Legends 
Many stories exist about Gim Yu-Shin. It is told that he once was ordered to subdue a rebel army, but his troops refused to fight as they had seen a large star fall from the sky and took this to be a bad omen. To regain the confidence of his troops, the General used a large kite to carry a fire ball into the sky. The soldiers, seeing the star return to heaven, rallied and defeated the rebels. It is also related how General Gim ingeniously used kites as a means of communication between his troops when they had become divided between islands and the mainland.

Gim Yu-Sin once spent the night at a courtesan's tavern, and when his mother learned of this, she cried and asked Gim Yu-Shin to never again set his foot in that kind of place. One night, Gim Yu-Siin was very drunk, and his horse took him to the courtesan's house. When Gim Yu-Shin woke,  he was angry at having broken his promise to his mother, and he slit the horse's throat.

His final years 
Throughout his life, Gim Yu-Sin felt that Baekje, Goguryeo, and Silla should not be separate countries but rather united as one. He is regarded as the driving force in the unification of the Korean Peninsula, and is the most famous of all the generals in the unification wars of the Three Kingdoms.

Gim Yu-Sin was rewarded handsomely for his efforts in the campaigns. In 668, King Munmu bestowed upon him the honorary title of Taedaegakgan (Hangul:태대각간 Hanja:太大角干), something like "Supreme Herald of Defense" (literally "greatest-great-trumpet-shield"). He reportedly received a village of over 500 households, and in 669 was given some 142 separate horse farms, spread throughout the kingdom. He died four years later, leaving behind ten children.

Gim Yu-Sin lived to the age of 79 and is considered to be one of the most famous generals and masters of Korean swords in Korean history. He is the focus of numerous stories and legends, and is familiar to most Koreans from a very early age. Following his death on 18 August (the 1st day of the 7th lunar month) 673, General Gim was awarded the honorary title of King Heungmu, and was buried at the foot of Songhwa Mountain,  near Gyeongju in southeastern Korea, in a tomb as splendid as that of kings.

Family 
Gim Yu-Sin had two sisters, Gim Bo-hee and Gim Mun-hee. Gim Mun-hee, later known as Queen Munmyeong (Hangul:문명왕후 Hanja:文明王后), married Yushin's friend Gim Cheon-chu, King Taejong Muyeol of Silla, who is credited for having led the unification of the Korean peninsula under Silla. Muyeol and Munmyeong were the parents of King Munmu of Silla and Gim Inmun.

Gim Yu-Shin's third wife, Lady Jiso (Hanja:智炤夫人), was the third daughter of King Muyeol of Silla.  Yushin had ten children.  His second son, Gim Won-sul, would later play a central role in completing the independence of Silla from the Tang dynasty.

Wife: Lady Jiso, daughter of King Muyeol of Silla and Queen Munmyeong
Son: Gim Sam-gwang (김삼광)
Son: Gim Won-sul (김원술)
Son: Gim Won-jeong (김원정)
Son: Gim Jang-yi (김장이)
Son: Gim Won-mang (김원망)
Daughter: Lady Gim of the Gimhae Gim clan (김해 김씨)
Daughter: Lady Gim of the Gimhae Gim clan (김해 김씨)
Daughter: Lady Gim of the Gimhae Gim clan (김해 김씨)
Daughter: Lady gim of the Gimhae Gim clan (김해 김씨)
Wife: Cheon Gwan-nyeo – Courtesan
Son: Gim Gun-seung (김군승) or Gim Si-deuk (김시득)

Legacy 
According to Samguk Sagi, Gim Yu-Sin was the descendant of Shaohao.

Today, Gim Yu-Sin is remembered by Koreans as one of the greatest generals in Korean history. His ultimate legacy is the first unification of the Korean nation. One of his ten children, his second son Gim Won-sul, became a general during the time of King Munmu of Silla, and he was essential in unifying Silla.

Jincheon Gilsangsa is a shrine dedicated to his portrait in Jincheon-eup, Jincheon-gun, Chungcheongbuk-do.

Popular culture 
 Portrayed by Yoon Seung-won, Lee Jong Soo and Lee David in 2006–2007 SBS TV series Yeon Gaesomun.
 Portrayed by Uhm Tae-woong and Lee Hyun-woo in the 2009 MBC TV series Queen Seondeok.
 Portrayed by Park Sung-woong in the 2011 MBC TV series Gyebaek.
 Portrayed by Kim Yu-seok and Noh Young-hak in the 2012–2013 KBS1 TV series The King's Dream.
Appeared in a Korean MMORPG Atlantica Online as a playable mercenary character Hwarang.
Portrayed by Jang Tae Wong in the 2017 KBS TV series Chronicles of Korea
Portrayed in the 2021 WEBNOVEL titled QUEEN JINDEOK by author GLORIAN.C.REGNARE.

Sources 
McBride, Richard D., II. “Hidden Agendas in the Life Writings of Kim Yusin.” Acta Koreana 1 (August 1998): 101–142.
McBride, Richard D., II. “The Structure and Sources of the Biography of Kim Yusin.”  Acta Koreana 16, no. 2 (December 2013):  497–535.

See also 

Korean history
Three Kingdoms of Korea
Queen Seondeok (TV series)

Notes

External links 
Gim Yusin

595 births
673 deaths
Gimhae Kim clan
Korean folk religion
Korean generals
Military history of Korea
People from Gyeongju
People from Jincheon County
Silla Buddhists